"Lady Lynda" is a song written by vocalist/guitarist Al Jardine and touring keyboardist Ron Altbach for American rock band the Beach Boys. It was released on the band's 1979 album L.A. (Light Album). Its melody is based on "Jesu, Joy of Man's Desiring" by J. S. Bach.

The opening harpsichord is played by Sterling Smith. The lyrics to the song refer to Jardine's then-wife, Lynda Jardine. After the two divorced, the song was rewritten as "Lady Liberty", a tribute to the Statue of Liberty.

Record World said it has "a big production sound and liberal synthesizer/string textures."

The song peaked at No. 6 on the UK Singles Chart. It also reached No. 39 on the U.S. adult contemporary chart. The song was edited for single release with the single version dropping the harpsichord introduction present on the album version.

Personnel
Credits from Craig Slowinski

Lady Lynda

The Beach Boys
Al Jardine – lead and backing vocals, 12-string guitar
Bruce Johnston - backing vocals; possible Fender Rhodes
Mike Love - backing vocals
Brian Wilson - possible backing vocals
Carl Wilson - backing vocals
Dennis Wilson – co-arrangement

Additional musicians

Murray Adler - violin
Arnold Belnick - violin
Samuel Boghossian - viola
Jimmy Bond - double bass
Verlye Mills Brilhart - harp
Ed Carter - guitar, bass guitar
Isabelle Daskoff - violin
Jim Decker - French horn
Harold Dicterow - violin
Jesse Ehrlich - cello
Henry Ferber - violin
Bobby Figueroa – drums, tambourine, tubular bells
Richard Folsom - violin
James Getzoff - violin
Harris Goldman - violin
Dick Hyde - trombones and bass trombone
Raymond Kelley - cello
Jerome Kessler - cello
William Kurasch - violin
Marvin Limonick - violin
Charles Loper - French horn
Arthur Maebe - French horn
Jay Migliori - flutes
Ray Pizzi - bassoons
Jack Redmond - French horn
William Reichenbach - French horn
Lyle Ritz - double bass
Jay Rosen - violin
David Schwartz - viola
Bobby Shew - trumpets
Harry Shlutz - cello
Sterling Smith - harpsichord; possible Fender Rhodes
Linn Subotnick - viola
Herschel Wise - viola
Tibor Zelig - violin

Full Sail

The Beach Boys
Bruce Johnston - backing vocals
Mike Love - backing vocals
Carl Wilson - lead and backing vocals, Fender Rhodes

Additional musicians

Murray Adler - violin
Arnold Belnick - violin
Samuel Boghossian - viola
Jimmy Bond - double bass
Verlye Mills Brilhart - harp
Geoffrey Cushing-Murray - backing vocals
Isabelle Daskoff - violin
Jim Decker - French horn
Harold Dicterow - violin
Jesse Ehrlich - cello
Henry Ferber - violin
Bobby Figueroa – backing vocals
Richard Folsom - violin
Steve Forman - percussion
James Getzoff - violin
Harris Goldman - violin
Jim Guercio - bass guitar
Raymond Kelley - cello
Jerome Kessler - cello
William Kurasch - violin
Marvin Limonick - violin
Charles Loper - French horn
Arthur Maebe - French horn
Gary Mallaber - drums, timpani
Jack Redmond - French horn
William Reichenbach - French horn
Lyle Ritz - double bass
Jay Rosen - violin
David Schwartz - viola
Harry Shlutz - cello
Linn Subotnick - viola
Herschel Wise - viola
Tibor Zelig - violin

References

1979 singles
The Beach Boys songs
Songs written by Al Jardine
Song recordings produced by James William Guercio
Song recordings produced by Bruce Johnston
Popular songs based on classical music